Peromyscus maniculatus is a rodent native to eastern North America. It is most commonly called the eastern deer mouse; when formerly grouped with the western deer mouse (P. sonoriensis), it was referred to as the North American deermouse and is fairly widespread across most of North America east of the Mississippi River, with the major exception being the lowland southeastern United States.

Like other Peromyscus species, it can be a vector and carrier of emerging infectious diseases such as hantaviruses and Lyme disease.

It is closely related to Peromyscus leucopus, the white-footed mouse.

Overview

The species in its former broad sense had 61 subspecies, but some of these now belong to P. sonoriensis. They are all tiny mammals that are plentiful in number. The deer mouse is a small rodent that lives in eastern North America and is closely related to the white-footed mouse, Peromyscus leucopus. Because the two species are extremely similar in appearance, they are best distinguished through red blood cell agglutination tests or karyotype techniques. The deer mouse can also be distinguished physically by its long and multicolored tail. Deer mice are very often used for laboratory experimentation due to their self cleanliness and easy care.

Physical description
They have large beady eyes and large ears giving them good sight and hearing. Peromyscus maniculatus has soft fur which varies in color, from gray to brown, but all deer mice have a distinguishable white underside and white feet. Deer mice tails are covered with fine hairs, with the same dark/light split as the fur on the rest of its body. P. maniculatus has distinct subspecies. Of those most common in North America, the woodland form has longer hind legs, a longer tail, and larger ears than the prairie form.

Behavior
Eastern deer mice are nocturnal creatures who spend the day time in areas such as trees or burrows where they have nests made of plant material. The pups within litters of deer mice are kept by the mother within an individual home range. Deer mice typically live in a home range of 242 to 3000 square meters. Although deer mice live in individual home ranges, these ranges do tend to overlap. When overlapping occurs, it is more likely to be with opposite sexes rather than with the same sex, as male deer mice have a much greater home range than the much more territorial females. Deer mice that live within overlapping home ranges tend to recognize one another and interact a lot. 

The woodland variety of P. maniculatus is an adept climber, and prefers tree cover meters above the ground, while the prairie form prefers to move from burrow to burrow in open areas, avoiding floral cover.

High-elevation adaptations 
Some deer mice are found at high elevations where there are low levels of oxygen and ambient temperatures. They encounter year-round hypoxia and cold, and undergo their entire reproductive cycles under these harsh conditions. Chronic hypoxia can limit the growth of these high-elevation deer mice during gestation, which can affect development and maternal physiology. However, high-elevation deer mice do appear to have several physiological adaptations that allow them to survive in these environments. High-elevation mice have a greater capacity for carbohydrate and lipid oxidation compared to low-elevation mice. Mouse populations living at different elevations show allelic variation among gene duplicates that encode the α-chain subunits of adult hemoglobin. Modifications in the α and β globin genes may also indicate an increase in hemoglobin-oxygen affinity and oxygen transport in these high-elevation populations.

Reproduction and life span

Procreation  

Peromyscus maniculatus are polygynous, meaning one male will mate with multiple females. They exhibit behaviors associated with polygyny, as males have much larger territory than females, live with multiple females, and are known to commit infanticide if they catch young unattended. Though they usually live alone, during winter the single male-multiple female cohort may live in a shared nest.

Breeding season
Deer mice can reproduce throughout the year, though in most parts of their range, they breed from March to October. Deer mouse breeding tends to be determined more by food availability rather than by season. In Virginia breeding peaks occur from April to June and from September to October.

Nesting
Female deer mice construct nests using a variety of materials including grasses, roots, mosses, wool, thistledown, and various artificial fibers. The male deer mice are allowed by the female to help nest the litter and keep them together and warm for survival.

In a study, less than half of both male and female deer mice left their original home range to reproduce. This means that there is intrafamilial mating and that the gene flow among deer mice as a whole is limited.

There have been recent studies that reveal deer mice also have OCD-like behaviors from altered gut microbiota. This phenomenon is typically shown in their abnormally large nest sizes and the behavior is present within 8 weeks of birth. Large nest building is considered to be a maladaptation as these mice are unnecessarily investing extra energy and effort in building larger nests in a laboratory where conditions are stable.

Gestation, litter size and productivity
Deer mice reproduce profusely and are highest in numbers among their species compared to other local mammals. Peromyscus species' gestation periods range from 22 to 26 days. Typical litters are composed of three to five young; litter size ranges from one to nine young. Most female deer mice have more than one litter per year. Three or four litters per year is probably typical; captive deer mice have borne as many as 14 litters in one year. Males usually live with the family and help care for the young.

Development of young
Deer mice pups are altricial, i.e. born blind, naked and helpless; development is rapid. Young deer mice have full coats by the end of the second week; their eyes open between 13 and 19 days and they are fully furred and independent in only a few weeks. Females lactate for 27 to 34 days after giving birth; most young are weaned at about 18 to 24 days. The young reach adult size at about 6 weeks and continue to gain weight slowly thereafter.

Age of first estrus averages about 48 days; the earliest recorded was 23 days. The youngest wild female to produce a litter was 55 days old; it was estimated that conception had occurred when she was about 32 days old.

Dispersal
Deer mouse pups usually disperse after weaning and before the birth of the next litter, when they are reaching sexual maturity. Occasionally juveniles remain in the natal area, particularly when breeding space is limited.

Longevity and mortality
In the lab their maximum life span is 96 months, and mean life expectancy is 45.5 months for females and 47.5 for males. In many areas deer mice live less than 1 year. One captive male deer mouse lived 32 months, and there is a report of a forest deer mouse that lived 8 years in captivity (another mouse was fertile until almost 6 years of age).

Habitat
Peromyscus maniculatus are found in all throughout eastern North America. The majority of deer mice nest high up, in large hollow trees. The deer mouse nests alone for the most part but during the winter will nest in groups of 10 or more. Deer mice, specifically the prairie form, are also abundant in the farmland of the midwestern United States. Deer mice can be found active on top of snow or beneath logs during the winter seasons. In northern New England deer mice are present in both coniferous and deciduous forests. Deer mice are often the only Peromyscus species in northern boreal forest. Subspecies differ in their use of plant communities and vegetation structures. There are two main groups of deer mouse: the prairie deer mouse and the woodland or forest deer mouse group.

Cover requirements
Deer mice are often active in open habitat; most subspecies do not develop hidden runways the way many voles (Microtus and Clethrionomys spp.) do. In open habitat within forests deer mice have a tendency to visit the nearest timber. In central Ontario deer mice used downed wood for runways.

Deer mice nest in burrows dug in the ground or construct nests in raised areas such as brush piles, logs, rocks, stumps, under bark, and in hollows in trees. Nests are also constructed in various structures and artifacts including old boards and abandoned vehicles.

Predators
Deer mice are important prey for snakes (Viperidae sp.), owls (Strigidae sp.), American mink (Neogale vison), American martens (Martes americana) and other mustelids, as well as skunks (Mephitis and Spilogale sp.), bobcats (Lynx rufus), domestic cats (Felis catus), coyotes (Canis latrans), and foxes (Vulpes vulpes and Urocyon cinereoargenteus). Deer mice are also parasitized by Cuterebra fontinella.

Diet
Deer mice are omnivorous; the main dietary items usually include seeds, fruits, arthropods, leaves, and fungi; fungi have the least amount of intake. Throughout the year, the deer mouse will change its eating habits to reflect on what is available to eat during that season. During winter months, the arthropods compose of one-fifth of the deer mouse's food. These include spiders, caterpillars, and heteropterans. During the spring months, seeds become available to eat, along with insects, which are consumed in large quantities. Leaves are also found in the stomachs of deer mice in the spring seasons. During summer months, the mouse consumes seeds and fruits. During the fall season, the deer mouse will slowly change its eating habits to resemble the winter's diet.

References

External links

Description of species
Additional description of species with photos
Additional information on species
Studying the homing ability of deer mice. (available on sci-hub).
Information on hantaviruses, which can be carried by this species

Peromyscus
Rodents of North America
Mammals of Canada
Storage pests
Mammals of the United States
Least concern biota of North America
Least concern biota of the United States
Mammals described in 1845
Taxa named by Johann Andreas Wagner